HHJ may refer to:
His/Her Honour Judge, an honorific prefix
Odder Line, a Danish rail line formerly known as Hads-Ning Herreders Jernbane